Science.tv is a virtual community for people interested in science.  It enables users to upload videos and categorize them according to subject matter and intended audience.

History 
science.tv was founded by Matt Thurling, a digital media pioneer and film-maker based in Bristol, England.  Research and development work began in 2005  and the site was launched in December 2007.  Thurling writes the science.tv blog, where he sets out the vision for the site and invites feedback and suggestions for improvements.

Domain name 
The .tv ("dot-tv") extension is a Top-level domain name, originally associated with the Polynesian island nation of Tuvalu.  The entire domain was purchased from the islands' residents in 2000  and the suffix is now increasingly being used for sites featuring, or relating to, video content.

Technology 
A look at the source code of science.tv reveals a front-end built with Cascading Style Sheets and JavaScript.  Video is delivered using the Adobe Flash codec.  The back-end relies on a PHP interface to a mySQL content management system.

Content 
The focus of science.tv is user-generated content, and much of the content on the site is actually embedded from other video sites, including YouTube.  The intended audience is broad, ranging from school students to academics and professional programme-makers.
Users are able to navigate for content via site-wide search, tags and by preset categories, which include: physics, chemistry and biology.

References 

Science websites
Defunct websites